Cascade Mountain is located in central Utah (Utah County just east of Provo and Orem Utah).

Hiking
There are several access routes to the summit. The safest and easiest routes are either from the Dry Fork trail that starts at the Rock Canyon Campground to the southwest of the mountain or the Big Springs trails from the east. There are many other routes from Bridal Veil Falls or the western side of the mountain but they are much more difficult.

See also

 List of mountains in Utah

References

External links

 Topography

Mountains of Utah County, Utah
Mountains of Utah
Provo, Utah